Synarthonia is a genus of lichen-forming fungi in the order Arthoniales. The genus has not been placed into a family. Synarthonia was circumscribed by Swiss lichenologist Johannes Müller Argoviensis in 1891.

Species
Synarthonia albopruinosa 
Synarthonia astroidestera 
Synarthonia aurantiacopruinosa 
Synarthonia bicolor 
Synarthonia borbonica 
Synarthonia ferruginea 
Synarthonia fuscata 
Synarthonia hodgesii 
Synarthonia inconspicua 
Synarthonia josephiana 
Synarthonia karunaratnei 
Synarthonia leproidica  – Luxembourg
Synarthonia lopingensis 
Synarthonia muriformis 
Synarthonia ochracea 
Synarthonia ochrodes 
Synarthonia pilosella 
Synarthonia psoromica  – India
Synarthonia rimeliicola 
Synarthonia sarcographoides 
Synarthonia sikkimensis  – India

References

Arthoniomycetes
Arthoniomycetes genera
Taxa named by Johannes Müller Argoviensis
Taxa described in 1891